Bayshore is an unincorporated community and census-designated place (CDP) in Lincoln County, Oregon, United States. It was first listed as a CDP prior to the 2020 census.

The CDP is in southern Lincoln County, bordered to the south by Alsea Bay and to the west by the Pacific Ocean. The city of Waldport is to the south across Alsea Bay. U.S. Route 101 passes through Bayshore, leading north  to Newport, the Lincoln county seat, and south through Waldport  to Yachats.

Demographics

References 

Census-designated places in Lincoln County, Oregon
Census-designated places in Oregon